Nick Carter and Red Club is a 1965 French action film directed by . The film is a sequel to Nick Carter va tout casser (1964).

Cast
Eddie Constantine	... 	Nick Carter
Nicole Courcel	... 	Dora
Joe Dassin	... 	Janos
Jeanne Valérie	... 	Lia
Graziella Galvani... 	Nanny
Marcello Pagliero	... 	Witt
Jacques Harden	... 	Herbert
Roger Rudel	... 	Beckman

References

External links
 
 
  Nick Carter and Red Club at www.filmsdefrance.com

1965 films
1960s spy thriller films
Italian spy action films
1960s French-language films
French spy thriller films
1960s spy action films
French sequel films
Nick Carter (literary character)
French spy action films
1960s French films
1960s Italian films